David Henry (born 13 June 1947) is a New Zealand cricketer. He played in six first-class and four List A matches for Wellington in 1980/81.

See also
 List of Wellington representative cricketers

References

External links
 

1947 births
Living people
New Zealand cricketers
Wellington cricketers
Cricketers from Queensland